Situated on the left bank of river Beas at an altitude of 1,800 meters, Naggar is an ancient town in Kullu district of Himachal Pradesh, India. It was once capital of the Kullu kingdom.

Geography 

It is bound by Kullu Tehsil towards South, Spiti Tehsil towards East, Drang Tehsil towards South and Lahul Tehsil towards North. Manali, Keylong, Mandi, Sundarnagar and Hamirpur are some of the nearby towns to Naggar.

Climate 
The climate in Naggar is mild. In winter, there is much less rainfall than in summer. The average temperature is 16.6 °C. In a year, the average rainfall is 1,730 mm.

History
Naggar was the capital of the erstwhile Kullu Rajas for about 1400 years. It was founded by the Visudh Pal and remained as the State headquarters until the capital was transformed to Kullu (Sultanpur) by Raja Jagat Singh.

Naggar Castle, the official seat of kings for centuries. was built by Raja Sidh Singh more than 500 years ago. According to a legend, he used stones from the abandoned palace (Gardhak) of Rana Bhonsal to build the castle. He ordered the labourers to form a human chain over the Beas river connecting its left and right banks to transfer the stones manually. The castle survived the earthquake of 1905. While most houses in the valley and the nearby city of Jawa were completely ruined, the castle's use of earthquake-proof techniques helped it sustain despite the calamity.

In 1978 it was taken over to Himachal Pradesh Tourism Development Corporation (HPTDC), to run as a heritage hotel.

The Russian painter and explorer Nicholas Roerich settled in Naggar in the early 20th century. The Roerich Estate, his two-floor house, is now a museum and key attraction of the town featuring a collection of his popular paintings.

Transport

Air 
The nearest airport is Bhuntar Airport in Kullu (IATA code KUU) located in Bhuntar town at a distance of 40.2 km (25 mi) from Naggar. The airport is situated on NH21 at a distance of 10 km (6 mi) south of Kullu and about 50 km (31 mi) south of Manali. Also known as Kullu-Manali airport, Bhuntar Airport has more than one kilometre long runway. Air India has regular flights to the airport from New Delhi.

Rail 
The nearest narrow gauge railhead is at Joginder Nagar. One can travel to this railway station via Pathankot Junction, and further by a taxi or cab.

Road 
Naggar is easily accessible through the buses run by HPTDC. These buses ply from Manali to Naggar via Khaknal. The road distance from Manali to Naggar via NH3 is 22 km (13.6 mi) while via Khaknal is 21 km (13 mi).

Access
 Distance from Delhi: 589 km
 Distance from Shimla: 246 km
 Distance from Kullu (main town): 26 km
 Distance from Manali: 22 km

Attractions

 Nicholas Roerich Art Gallery
 Gauri Shanker Temple
 Tripura Sundri Temple
 Vasuki Nag Temple
 Naggar Castle
Krishna temple

References

External links 

 Himachal Tourism Dep. Co.
 Himachal Tourism Department India

Cities and towns in Kullu district